"Tu t'laisses aller" (English: "You Let Yourself Go") is a song written in 1960 by Armenian-French artist Charles Aznavour.

History
For the first time it was released as a single in 1960 by Barclay Records (with "J'ai perdu la tête" on the B-side). In 1974 a new edition was re-released as a single.

The husband drinks alcohol to have the strength to tell his wife everything he thinks about her. He says the worst possible things to her, but then he adds, that a little effort and a smiling face, and things could be just as before. In the end he calls her: "Come close to me. Let yourself go".

It was a no. 1 hit in France in 1960, a best-selling record in Belgium in 1960, and returned to the charts in 1962.

In Jean-Luc Godard's film A Woman Is a Woman, the song plays on a jukebox during a tense encounter between Anna Karina and Jean-Paul Belmondo.

In 1995 Aznavour recorded a version of "Tu t'laisses aller" in duet with Liza Minnelli (Paris — Palais des Congrès: Intégrale du spectacle).

Adaptations
German: "Du läßt dich gehn", written by Ernst Bader
English: "You've Let Yourself Go", written by Marcel Stellman
English: "You've Let Yourself Go", adaptation by Fred Ebb for Liza with a Z (1972 NBC-TV)
Dutch: "Mijn ideaal", written by Jip Feldman, song by Corry Brokken

Cover versions
Annie Cordy
Jacques Desrosiers (parody)
Dieter Thomas Kuhn & Band (1998)

See also
40 chansons d'or

References

External links
Tu t'laisses aller (live)

Songs about alcohol
Charles Aznavour songs
French songs
Songs written by Charles Aznavour
1960 songs
1960 singles
Barclay (record label) singles
Songs with lyrics by Ernst Bader
Songs with lyrics by Fred Ebb